In Greek mythology, Pyrrha (Ancient Greek: Πύρρα) may refer to the following women:

 Pyrrha, wife of Deucalion.
 Pyrrha, a Theban princess as the younger daughter of King Creon probably by his wife Eurydice or Henioche. Besides her older sister Megara, Pyrrha has three brothers with the names: Menoeceus (Megareus), Lycomedes and Haemon. She was married by her father to Iphicles, the son of Amphitryon, who was previously wedded to Automedusa, daughter of Alcathous. By Iphicles, Pyrrha became the mother of two unknown children who were later on thrown into the fire by Heracles during the hero's fit of madness. Together with her sister, Henioche, they were statues erected for them near the temple of Ismenian Apollo in Thebes.
 Pyrrha, possibly the name used by Achilles while hiding as a maid among the daughters of King Lycomedes of Skyros.

Notes

References 

 Apollodorus, The Library with an English Translation by Sir James George Frazer, F.B.A., F.R.S. in 2 Volumes, Cambridge, MA, Harvard University Press; London, William Heinemann Ltd. 1921. ISBN 0-674-99135-4. Online version at the Perseus Digital Library. Greek text available from the same website.
Gaius Julius Hyginus, Fabulae from The Myths of Hyginus translated and edited by Mary Grant. University of Kansas Publications in Humanistic Studies. Online version at the Topos Text Project.
 Hesiod, Shield of Heracles from The Homeric Hymns and Homerica with an English Translation by Hugh G. Evelyn-White, Cambridge, MA.,Harvard University Press; London, William Heinemann Ltd. 1914. Online version at the Perseus Digital Library. Greek text available from the same website.
 Pausanias, Description of Greece with an English Translation by W.H.S. Jones, Litt.D., and H.A. Ormerod, M.A., in 4 Volumes. Cambridge, MA, Harvard University Press; London, William Heinemann Ltd. 1918. . Online version at the Perseus Digital Library
Pausanias, Graeciae Descriptio. 3 vols. Leipzig, Teubner. 1903.  Greek text available at the Perseus Digital Library.
 Sophocles, The Antigone of Sophocles edited with introduction and notes by Sir Richard Jebb. Cambridge. Cambridge University Press. 1893. Online version at the Perseus Digital Library.
 Sophocles, Sophocles. Vol 1: Oedipus the king. Oedipus at Colonus. Antigone. With an English translation by F. Storr. The Loeb classical library, 20. Francis Storr. London; New York. William Heinemann Ltd.; The Macmillan Company. 1912. Greek text available at the Perseus Digital Library.

Princesses in Greek mythology
Theban characters in Greek mythology
Theban mythology